A Member of the Provincial Assembly, or MPA  is a representative elected by the voters of an electoral district to the legislature or legislative assembly of a subnational jurisdiction. In Pakistan, the members are elected by the voters in provinces for a term of five years.

Eligibility criteria 
The following requirements must be met in order for someone to be eligible to join the Provincial Assembly of Pakistan;

 Must be a Pakistani national.
 Cannot be younger than 25 years old.
 Not be found guilty by the jury.
 Sufficient understanding of Islamic beliefs.
 Must be a moral individual.
 Must be ameen and sadiq.
 Must be registered to vote in a Pakistani provincial constituency.

Disqualification grounds 
A person wouldn't be eligible to represent Pakistan in the Provincial Assembly if;

 Has a bad mental health.
 Is bankrupt.
 Has lost his or her citizenship in Pakistan.
 Is therefore ineligible under any law passed by the Pakistani parliament.
 Is therefore disqualified due to desertion.
 Has, among other things, been found guilty of inciting animosity amongst various groups.
 Has been found guilty of the crime of bribery.
 Has received a conviction for a crime and a prison term of more than two years.
 Has been fired due to corruption or state disloyalty (in the case of a government servant).

Term 
The member of provincial assembly have a five-year term starting on the day of their first meeting. All four provincial assemblies begin their five-year tenure at roughly the same time because general elections for all of them are held on the same day. This enables elections for all of the assemblies to be held on a single day and assists the governments in deciding to dissolve the assemblies on a single day after five years.

Responsibilities 
Members of Pakistan's provincial assembly have the following duties:

 Legislative: Making the appropriate laws through legislation.
 Oversight: Ensuring that the executive's responsibilities are being met.
 Representation: To speak in the provincial assembly on behalf of the views and preferences of their constituency.
 Power of the purse: The ability to control and approve planned government budgetary receipts and expenditures.

Seat allocation 
According to the Constitution of Pakistan, the number of seats in each provincial assembly is determined by the population of the corresponding province. Women and non-muslims have reserved seats in addition to the general seating.

Provincial Assemblies in Pakistan 
 Provincial Assembly of Balochistan
 Provincial Assembly of Sindh
 Provincial Assembly of Khyber-Pakhtunkhwa
 Provincial Assembly of the Punjab
Provincial Assembly of Gilgit Baltistan
Provincial Assembly of Azad Jammu and Kashmir

See also 
 Member of the National Assembly of Pakistan
 Member of Parliament, Senate of Pakistan

References

External links 
 Provincial Assembly of Balochistan
 Provincial Assembly of Sindh
 Provincial Assembly of Khyber-Pakhtunkhwa
 Provincial Assembly of the Punjab
 National Assembly of Pakistan
 Senate of Pakistan

Parliamentary titles